Jeffrey Bryan is an American lawyer from Minnesota who is a Judge of the Minnesota Court of Appeals.

Education 

Bryan earned his Bachelor of Arts, summa cum laude, from the University of Texas at Austin and his Juris Doctor from Yale Law School.

Career 

Bryan was a judicial clerk for Judge Paul A. Magnuson of the United States District Court for the District of Minnesota. He later became an Assistant United States Attorney for the United States Attorney's Office, where he prosecuted economic fraud and drug-trafficking conspiracies, and was a civil litigation attorney for Robins Kaplan LLP where he developed a litigation practice emphasizing antitrust law and intellectual property disputes.

State court 
On July 11, 2013, he was appointed as a trial court judge in the Second Judicial District by Governor Mark Dayton to fill the vacancy left by the retirement of J. Thomas Mott.

Minnesota Court of Appeals 
On October 9, 2019, Governor Tim Walz announced the appointment of Bryan to be a Judge of the Minnesota Court of Appeals. He filled the vacancy left by Heidi Schellhas. He serves in an at-large capacity.

Community activities 
Bryan is an active member of the Minnesota Hispanic Bar Association, and previously served on the Macalester-Groveland Community Council and chaired the Minnesota Minority Recruiting Conference Committee for Twin Cities Diversity in Practice. He also serves on the Minnesota Task Force on Missing and Murdered Indigenous Women, the Minnesota Supreme Court Rules of Evidence Advisory Committee, and on the board of various community organizations, including the Minnesota Urban Debate League, Twin Cities Habitat for Humanity.

References

External links 

Living people
20th-century American lawyers
21st-century American judges
Year of birth missing (living people)
Place of birth missing (living people)
Assistant United States Attorneys
Hispanic and Latino American judges
Minnesota Court of Appeals judges
Minnesota lawyers
Minnesota state court judges
University of Texas at Austin alumni
Yale Law School alumni